This is a list of international and national copyright collection societies and companies, also called "copyright collectives".

Global 
 Association of International Collective Management of Audiovisual Works (AGICOA)
 Bureau International des Sociétés Gérant les Droits D'Enregistrement et les Reproduction Mecanique (BIEM)
 Christian Copyright Licensing International (CCLI)
International Confederation of Societies of Authors and Composers (CISAC)
 International Federation of the Phonographic Industry (IFPI)
 Motion Picture Licensing Corporation (MPLC)

Asia

Azerbaijan 
 Copyright Agency of Azerbaijan Republic (Azərbaycan Respublikası Müəllif Hüquqları Agentliyi)

China 
 Music Copyright Society of China (MCSC)

India 
 Indian Reprographic Rights Organisation (IRRO)
 Recorded Music Performance Ltd (RMPL)
 The Indian Performing Right Society Ltd (IPRS)

Hong Kong 
 Composers and Authors Society of Hong Kong Ltd. (CASH)

Japan 
 Music
 Japanese Society for Rights of Authors, Composers and Publishers (JASRAC) - Largest CMO in Japanese music industries.
  (MPN)
 Visual arts
  (APG-Japan) - A member of the International Confederation of Societies of Authors and Composers.
  (JASPAR) - Non-Japanese visual arts such as Marc Chagall, Salvador Dalí and Le Corbusier. 
  (SPDA) - Handles works of Pablo Picasso and Henri Matisse. Downsized after the JASPAR's spin-off in 2012.
  (JPCA) - Represents ten photographic business associations such as Japan Professional Photographers Society.
 Videos
  (PRE) - Collects licensing fees of TV programs.
 Publications
  (JPCA) - Issued a strong statement against Google Book Search Settlement Agreement.
  (JRRC) - Mainly on behalf of paper-based publishers.
  (RRAC)

Malaysia 

 Public Performance Malaysia (PPM) - A not-for-profit Collective Management Organization (CMO), represents all eligible Malaysian recording companies and international recording companies who have exclusively licensed PPM members to control their rights in Malaysia.

Philippines 
 Filipino Society of Composers, Authors and Publishers (FILSCAP)

Russia 
 Russian Organization for Intellectual Property VOIS (Collective society related rights)
 Russian Organization for Multimedia and Digital Systems (ROMS, or POMC in Russian; aka Russian Multimedia and Internet Society)
 Russian Author's Society (RAO)

South Korea 
Korea Music Copyright Association (KOMCA)

Africa

Ghana
 Ghana Music Rights Organization (GHAMRO)

Kenya 
 Music Copyright Society of Kenya (MCSK)

South Africa 
 Southern African Music Rights Organisation (SAMRO)

Uganda 
 Uganda Performing Right Society

Zambia 
Zambian music Copyright Protection Society (ZAMCOPS)

Europe 
Association of European Performers' Organisations AEPO-ARTIS

Austria 

 AKM: .

Basque Country 
 EKKI institution for managing authors’ and other rights holders' rights

Belgium 
 Société d'Auteurs Belge – Belgische Auteurs Maatschappij (SABAM)

Bulgaria 
 Musicautor is the organisation of authors and music publishers for managing of copyrights

Croatia 
 Croatian Composers' Society

Cyprus 
 PRS for Music, formerly MCPS-PRS Alliance

Czech Republic 

 DILIA (Divadelní, literární, audiovizuální agentura)
 Ochranný svaz autorský
 INTERGRAM (INTERGRAM, nezávislá společnost výkonných umělců a výrobců zvukových a zvukově-obrazových záznamů)
 OOA-S (Ochranná organizace autorská – Sdružení autorů děl výtvarného umění, architektury a obrazové složky audiovizuálních děl)
 OAZA (Ochranná asociace zvukařů – autorů)

Denmark 
 
 KODA 
 Nordisk Copyright Bureau

Finland 
 Teosto (authors and composers of musical works)

France 
 Société des auteurs et compositeurs dramatiques (SACD)
 Société des auteurs, compositeurs et éditeurs de musique (SACEM) 
 Société de la Propriété Artistique et des Dessins et Modèles (SPADEM), visual artists - defunct
 Société des Auteurs Dans Les Arts Graphiques et Plastiques (ADAGP), visual artists
 Syndicat National de l'Édition Phonographique (SNEP), the National Syndicate of Phonographic Publishing
 Organisme de gestion collective des droits des artistes-interprètes (ADAMI), for performers
 Société de Perception et de Distribution des Droits des Artistes-Interprètes (SPEDIDAM), for performers

Germany 
 Gesellschaft für musikalische Aufführungs- und mechanische Vervielfältigungsrechte (GEMA)
 Gesellschaft zur Übernahme und Wahrnehmung von Filmaufführungsrechten mbH (GÜFA)
 Cultural Commons Collecting Society SCE mbH (C3S) (planned)
  – Artists, Photographers und Filmmakers.
 VG Wort – Verwertungsgesellschaft Wort.

 Gesellschaft zur Verwertung von Leistungsschutzrechten – GVL (Performing artists, Producers of sound recordings).

Greece 
 : Producers, Musicians, Singers (neighboring rights).

Republic of Ireland 
 Irish Music Rights Organisation (IMRO)

Italy 
 Società Italiana degli Autori ed Editori (SIAE).
 Rete Artisti Spettacolo Innovazione  (RASI). www.reteartistispettacolo.it

The Netherlands 
 Buma/Stemra

Norway 
TONO (Copyright collective for authors and composers of musical works)

Poland 
There are fourteen officially recognized copyright collection societies in Poland, among them:

 ZAiKS (Polish Society of Authors and Composers)
 ZPAV (Polish Society of the Phonographic Industry)
 ZPAP (Association of Polish Artists and Designers)
 SARP (Association of Polish Architects)

Portugal 
 Sociedade Portuguesa de Autores (SPA)

Slovenia 
 AIPA (Collecting Society of Authors, Performers and Producers of Audiovisual Works in Slovenia)  [si]
 IPF (Collective Management of the Rights of Performers and Phonogram Producers in Slovenia)  [si]
 SAZAS (Collective Management Society for Musical Authors' Rights in Slovenia  [si]

Slovakia 
 SOZA (Slovak Performing Rights Society)

Spain 

 SGAE: Sociedad General de Autores y Editores.

Sweden 
 Svenska Tonsättares Internationella Musikbyrå (STIM) (English: Swedish Performing Rights Society).
 IFPI Sweden - International Federation of the Phonographic Industry (Swedish Society of Music Companies)

Switzerland 
 Motion Picture Licensing Company Switzerland
 
 SUISA – Schweizerische Gesellschaft für die Rechte der Urheber musikalischer Werke.

Ukraine 
 Ukrainian Agency of Copyright and Related Rights (UACRR)

United Kingdom 
 Authors' Licensing and Collecting Society (ALCS)
 Artists' Collecting Society (ACS)
 Christian Copyright Licensing International, United Kingdom
 Copyright Licensing Agency (CLA)
 Design and Artists Copyright Society (DACS)
 Directors UK (D-UK), formerly the Directors' and Producers' Rights Society (DPRS)
 Motion Picture Licensing Corporation (MPLC)
 Mechanical-Copyright Protection Society (MCPS)
 PRS for Music, formerly MCPS-PRS Alliance
 Phonographic Performance Limited (PPL)
 Publishers' Licensing Services (PLS)

Middle East

Israel 
 Society of Authors, Composers and Music Publishers in Israel (ACUM) (performance rights society, representing authors, poets, lyricists, composers, arrangers, and music publishers)
 Tali Rights, the Israeli Scriptwriters & Directors Collecting society

Turkey 
 Müzik Yorumcuları Birliği (MÜYORBİR)

Lebanon 
 Société des auteurs, compositeurs et éditeurs de musique (SACEM)

North America

Canada 
 Access Copyright – The Canadian Copyright Licensing Agency (formerly CanCopy)
 American Federation of Musicians of the United States and Canada (AFM)
 Canadian Artists' Representation Copyright Collective (CARCC)
 Canadian Musical Reproduction Rights Agency Ltd (CMRRA Ltd)
 Canadian Private Copying Collective (CPCC)
 Playwrights Guild of Canada (PGC) (formerly Playwrights Union of Canada)
 Re:Sound Music Licensing Company
 Société des auteurs et compositeurs dramatiques (SACD)
 Society of Composers, Authors and Music Publishers of Canada (SOCAN)

United States 
 AFM & SAG-AFTRA Intellectual Property Rights Distribution Fund
 AllTrack (AllTrack Performing Rights), a US-based performance right organization 
 American Society of Composers, Authors and Publishers (ASCAP)
 Artists Rights Society
 BMI (Broadcast Music Inc.)
 Christian Copyright Licensing International
 Copyright Clearance Center (CCC)
 Harry Fox Agency, a US-based music rights agency for reproduction rights
 Mechanical Licensing Collective (the MLC), the US based mechanical rights organization designated by the US Copyright Office. 
 Music Reports, a US-based music rights licensing company
 Motion Picture Licensing Corporation (MPLC)
 SESAC, a US-based performance rights association
 SoundExchange, a digital performance rights association (non-interactive radio)
 Pro Music Rights, a US-based performance rights association

South America

Argentina 
 Sociedad Argentina de Autores y Compositores de Música (SADAIC)

Brazil 
 Escritório Central de Arrecadação e Distribuição (ECAD)
 Motion Picture Licensing Corporation Brasil

Oceania

Australasia
 Australasian Mechanical Copyright Owners Society (AMCOS)
 Australasian Performing Right Association (APRA)

Australia 
 Australian Writers Guild Authorship Collecting Society (AWGACS)
 Copyright Agency Limited (CAL)
 Phonographic Performance Company of Australia (PPCA)
 Screenrights: The Audio Visual Copyright Society (Audio-Visual Collecting Society Ltd)

References

 
Collection societies